Holon is  a city on the central coastal strip south of Tel Aviv, Israel.

Holon may also refer to:

 Holon (Nik Bärtsch album), 2008
 Holon (Equinox album), 1998
 Holon (philosophy), something that is simultaneously a whole and a part
 Holon (physics), a quasiparticle that electrons can split into during the process of spin–charge separation
 Holon (sculpture), a sculpture by Donald Wilson in Portland, Oregon

See also
 Holo (disambiguation)
 Holonomic (disambiguation)
 Holonomy, a concept in differential geometry
 Holonymy, the relationship between a term denoting the whole and a term denoting a part of the whole